The 2019 season was the Cincinnati Bengals' 50th in the National Football League (NFL), their 52nd overall, their 20th playing home games at Paul Brown Stadium and the first under head coach Zac Taylor. This was the Bengals' first season since 2002 without long-time head coach Marvin Lewis, as he mutually agreed to part ways after the conclusion of the 2018 season.

Not only did the Bengals not improve upon last season's record of 6–10, but they also suffered an 0–11 start to the season for the first time in franchise history. As a result, they became the first team to be eliminated from playoff contention when they lost to the Oakland Raiders in Week 11, extending their playoff drought to four seasons. This marked the Bengals' fourth consecutive losing season. They finished the season 2–14, tying their franchise-worst record from 2002.

The Bengals won their first game in Week 13, when they defeated the New York Jets, 22–6.

With a Week 16 loss to the Miami Dolphins, the Bengals secured the first overall pick in the 2020 NFL Draft, which was then used to select QB Joe Burrow. It was the first time they had the first overall pick since 2003, when they drafted QB Carson Palmer. This would end up being quarterback Andy Dalton's final season with the Bengals, as he was released shortly after the team drafted Burrow.

Offseason

Coaching changes
 February 4, 2019: Named Zac Taylor head coach, the tenth head coach in Bengals history. Taylor was previously the Los Angeles Rams quarterbacks coach.
 February 7, 2019: Announced the hiring of four offensive assistants: Brian Callahan as offensive coordinator, Jim Turner will be the offensive line coach, James Casey as tight ends coach, Ben Martin as assistant offensive line coach.
 February 11, 2019: Announced the hiring of three assistant coaches: Jemal Singleton as running backs coach, Joey Boese as strength and conditioning coach, and Doug Rosfeld as director of coaching operations. Rosfeld was previously the head football coach at Cincinnati's Archbishop Moeller High School in 2018.
 February 21, 2019: Announced the hiring of Lou Anarumo as defensive coordinator. Anarumo was previously the defensive backs coach for the New York Giants. Prior to joining the Giants, he was the defensive backs coach for the Miami Dolphins from 2012 to 2017.
 February 28, 2019: Announced the hiring of six assistant coaches: Nick Eason as defensive line coach, Tem Lukabu as linebackers coach, Brad Kragthorpe as an offensive assistant, Jordan Kovacs as defensive quality control coach, and Todd Hunt and Garrett Swanson as assistant strength and conditioning coaches.
 March 7, 2019: Announced the hiring of two assistant coaches, Mark Duffner as senior defensive assistant, and Gerald Chatman as a defensive assistant.

Free agents

Unrestricted

Restricted and Exclusive-Rights

Signings

Departures

Draft

Notes
 The Bengals were awarded three compensatory picks (210th, 211th and 213th overall) by the NFL.
 The Bengals received a sixth-round draft pick (198th overall) from the Dallas Cowboys in exchange for cornerback Bene Benwikere.
 The Bengals received the Denver Broncos second-, fourth- and sixth-round selections (52nd, 125th and 182nd overall) in exchange for the Bengals' second-round selection (42nd overall).
 The Bengals received the San Francisco 49ers fourth-round selection (104th overall) in exchange for two of the Bengals sixth-round selections (183rd and 198th overall).
 The Bengals received the Dallas Cowboys fourth-round selection (136th overall) in exchange for the Bengals fifth- and sixth-round selections (149th and 213th overall).

Undrafted free agents

Staff

Final roster

Preseason

Regular season

Schedule

Note: Intra-division opponents are in bold text.

Game summaries

Week 1: at Seattle Seahawks

The Bengals began their season on the road against the Seahawks.  In the first quarter, the Bengals scored first when Randy Bullock made a 39-yard field goal for a 3–0 lead and the only score of the period.  In the second quarter, the Seahawks took the lead when Chris Carson ran for a 1-yard touchdown to make it 7–3.  The Bengals retook the lead when John Ross III caught a 33-yard TD pass from Andy Dalton to make it 10–7.  The Seahawks then went back into the lead when Carson caught a 10-yard TD pass from  Russell Wilson to make it 14–10.  Though, the Bengals moved back into the lead when Dalton found Ross III again on a 55-yard TD pass to make it 17–14 at halftime.  After a scoreless third quarter, the Seahawks retook the lead when Tyler Lockett caught a 44-yard TD pass from Wilson to make it 21–17.  Later on in the fourth quarter, Bullock got the Bengals within 1 when he kicked a 27-yard field goal to make it 21–20.  The Bengals' defense forced the Seahawks to go 3 and out and got the ball back.  Dalton had completed a 6-yard pass to Tyler Eifert.  However, the Seahawks' defense stood up to Dalton on the next play and then sacked him for then he fumbled and the Seahawks recovered sealing the game.

With the loss, the Bengals started 0–1.

Week 2: vs. San Francisco 49ers

After a tough road loss, the Bengals went home to face the 49ers.  The 49ers scored first when Marquise Goodwin caught a 38-yard TD pass from Jimmy Garoppolo to make it 7–0.  The Bengals tied the game up at 7–7 when Andy Dalton found Tyler Eifert on a 1-yard TD pass.  The 49ers however retook the lead when Garoppolo found Raheem Mostert on a 39-yard TD pass to make it 14–7.  In the second quarter, the 49ers increased their lead when Jeff Wilson ran for a 2-yard TD to make it 21–7.  The Bengals drew closer when Randy Bullock kicked a 37-yard field goal to make it 21–10.  Though, the 49ers would move back into a 2-touchdown lead when Robbie Gould kicked a 33-yard field goal for a 24–10 halftime lead.  In the third quarter, it was all 49ers when Garoppolo found Deebo Sanders on a 2-yard TD pass to make it 31–10.  This would be followed by Gould kicking a 38-yard field goal to make it 34–10.  By the fourth quarter, the 49ers pretty much sealed the game as Wilson ran for a 4-yard TD to make it 41–10.  The scoring ended when Dalton found John Ross III on a late 66-yard TD pass to make the final score 41–17.

With the loss, the Bengals fell to 0–2.

Week 3: at Buffalo Bills

The Bengals traveled for a Week 3 duel against the Bills.  In the first half, it was all Bills scoring starting in the first quarter when they jumped out to a 14–0 lead before halftime.  Though, the Bengals would respond by taking the lead well into the fourth quarter to make it 17–14, the Bills scored a late TD when Frank Gore ran it from a yard out.  Getting the ball back late in the game and able to drive to the Bills' 28-yard line, Andy Dalton threw the game losing interception on a 3rd and 5 sealing the 21–17 victory for the Bills.

With the loss, the Bengals fell to 0–3.

Week 4: at Pittsburgh Steelers

The Bengals then traveled again to Pittsburgh to take on the 0–3 division rival Steelers.  In the first quarter, the Bengals managed to make it 3–0 after Randy Bullock kicked a 28-yard field goal.  However, from the second quarter on wards, it would be all Steelers scoring which would lead to the eventual final score of 27–3 and a win sealed for them.

With the loss, the Bengals fell to 0–4.  The team also suffered its ninth straight loss to the Steelers and first 0-4 start since 2008.

Week 5: vs. Arizona Cardinals

After another tough road loss, the Bengals returned home to face the Cardinals.  The Bengals scored first when Randy Bullock kicked a 23-yard field goal to make it 3–0.  The Cardinals however took the lead later in the quarter when Kyler Murray ran for a 4-yard TD to make it 7–3.  The Cardinals made it 10–3 in the second quarter when Zane Gonzalez kicked a 23-yard field goal.  Though, the Bengals would come within 4 when Bullock kicked a 48-yard field goal to make it 10–6.  Gonzalez then put the Cardinals back up by a touchdown with a 20-yard field goal to make it 13–6 at halftime.  In the third quarter, the Bengals came within 4 again as Bullock kicked yet another 23-yard field goal to make it 13–9.  In the fourth quarter, the Cardinals would take a 2-touchdown lead when Gonzalez kicked a 22-yard field goal followed by Chase Edmonds running for a 37-yard TD for 16–9 and 23–9 leads.  Andy Dalton then found Auden Tate on a 2-yard TD pass to make it 23–16.  He would then find Tyler Boyd on a 42-yard TD pass to tie the game up at 23–23.  The Cardinals got the ball back and the Bengals' defense stalled, allowing them to drive down the field and Gonzalez kicked the game-winning 31-yard field goal to make the final score 26–23.

With the loss, the Bengals dropped to 0–5.  This would be the team's first such start since 2008.

Week 6: at Baltimore Ravens

The Bengals then traveled to take on the Ravens.  In the first quarter, the Bengals scored first when Brandon Wilson returned a kickoff 92 yards for a TD.  The Ravens however, took the lead when Lamar Jackson ran for a 21-yard TD to tie the game at 7–7 followed by Mark Ingram II's 1-yard TD run to make it 14–7.  In the second quarter, the Ravens made it 17–7 when Justin Tucker kicked a 40-yard field goal.  The Bengals were able to make it a 7-point deficit when Randy Bullock kicked a 22-yard field goal to make it 17–10 at halftime.  In the third quarter, the Ravens moved up by double digits when Tucker kicked a 49-yard field goal to make it 20–10 for the quarter's only score.  They would then make it 23–10 when Tucker kicked a 21-yard field goal.  The Bengals then came within 6 when Andy Dalton ran for a 2-yard TD.  Trying to get the ball back with seconds left, the Bengals tried for an onside kick.  However, the Ravens recovered the ball and sealed their win and another Bengals loss.

With the loss, the Bengals dropped to 0–6.

Week 7: vs. Jacksonville Jaguars

The Bengals then went back home for a game against the Jaguars.  After a scoreless first quarter, the Jaguars would score first in the second quarter when Josh Lambo kicked a 21-yard field goal to make it 3–0.  However, the Bengals were able to take the lead when Andy Dalton found Joe Mixon on a 2-yard TD pass.  The Jaguars then came within a point when Lambo kicked a 29-yard field goal to make it 7–6 at halftime.  In third quarter, the Jaguars moved into the lead when Lambo kicked a 37-yard field goal to make it 9–7.  Though, the Bengals would regain the lead when Randy Bullock kicked a 38-yard field goal to make it 10–9.  In the fourth quarter, the Jaguars took the lead back when Keelan Cole caught a 2-yard TD pass from Gardner Minshew (with a successful 2-point conversion) to make it 17–10.  This would be followed by them sealing the game when Yannick Ngakoue returned an interception 23 yards for a TD followed by Lambo's 26-yard field goal to make it 24–10 and then 27–10.  Dalton would run for a 1-yard TD with seconds left to make the final score 27–17.

With the loss, the Bengals fell to 0–7.

Week 8: at Los Angeles Rams
NFL London Games

After another tough loss at home, the Bengals traveled to London to take on the Rams.  The Bengals were considered the away team for this game.  In the first quarter, the Rams scored its only points with Greg Zuerlein's 23-yard field goal to make it 3–0.  The Bengals tied it up in the second quarter when Randy Bullock kicked a 28-yard field goal to make it 3–3.  The Rams retook the lead when Jared Goff found Josh Reynolds on a 31-yard TD pass to make it 10–3.  However, the Bengals would tie it up again when Andy Dalton found Joe Mixon on a 1-yard TD pass to make it 10–10.  The Rams moved back into the lead at halftime when Goff found Cooper Kupp on a 65-yard TD pass to make it 17–10.  In the third quarter, the Rams would score the only points of the whole entire half when Todd Gurley II ran for a 3-yard TD to make it 24–10 as both teams headed into a scoreless fourth quarter, the Rams sealed the win, handing the Bengals yet another loss.

With the loss, the Bengals head into their bye week at 0–8.  It would be the team's first such start since 2008 as they were also guaranteed their fourth straight non-winning season.  This would happen for the first time since the 2001–2004 seasons.  Andy Dalton became the first quarterback in NFL history to have starts of 8–0 (in 2015) and 0–8.

During the team's bye week, the Miami Dolphins defeated the New York Jets 26–18, making the Bengals the last winless team in 2019.  Also during their bye week, the Bengals benched Dalton in favor of rookie fourth round draft pick Ryan Finley.

Week 10: vs. Baltimore Ravens

Coming off their bye week, the Bengals went back home for their second game against the Ravens. The Ravens made it 7–0 in the first quarter when Lamar Jackson found Mark Andrews on a 2-yard TD pass. They would make it 14–0 when Mark Ingram II ran for a 1-yard TD. In the second quarter, the Bengals got on the board when Randy Bullock kicked a 42-yard field goal to make it 14–3. The Ravens then pulled away as Jackson found Andrews again on a 17-yard TD pass to make it 21–3. This would be followed by Marcus Peters returning an interception 89 yards for a touchdown to make it 28–3.  The Bengals then made it 28–10 at halftime when Ryan Finley found Tyler Boyd on a 6-yard TD pass.

In the third quarter, it was all Ravens as they managed to score 3 touchdowns: First, Jackson ran for one from 47 yards out. This would be followed by him finding Marquise Brown on a 20-yard pass and then Tyus Bowser returned a fumble 33 yards to make the score  49–10. Bullock added a useless field goal late in the fourth quarter to make the final score 49–13.

With the loss, the Bengals fell to 0–9.  It would be the team's first 0–9 start since 1993.  They were also swept by the Ravens for the first time since 2011.  The team is also assured their fourth consecutive losing season for the first time since 1999–2002.

Week 11: at Oakland Raiders

After a horrifying loss at home, the Bengals traveled to take on the Raiders.  The Bengals would score first when Joe Mixon ran for a 3-yard TD to make it 7–0 for the quarter's only score.  In the second quarter, the Raiders responded with 2 touchdowns of their own: Derek Carr found Foster Moreau on a 2-yard TD pass and then Carr ran for another from 3 yards out to make it 7–7 and then 14–7 at halftime.  In the third quarter, the Bengals came within 4  when Randy Bullock kicked a 40-yard field goal to make it 14–10 for the quarter's only score.  In the fourth quarter, the Raiders moved ahead by a touchdown when Daniel Carson kicked a 20-yard field goal to make it 17–10.  Getting the ball back later on in the quarter, Ryan Finley would be sacked.  On the next play, he would throw the game-losing interception, sealing another Bengals loss.

With the loss, the Bengals fell to 0–10 for the first time since 1993 and were eliminated from postseason contention.

Week 12: vs. Pittsburgh Steelers

The Bengals then returned home for the second game of the season series against the Steelers.  After a scoreless first quarter, the Steelers scored first when Chris Boswell kicked a 26-yard field goal to make it 3–0.  The Bengals, however, would take the lead later on when Ryan Finley found Tyler Boyd on a 15-yard TD pass to make it 7–3 at halftime.  In the third quarter, the Steelers retook the lead when Devlin Hodges found James Washington on a 79-yard TD pass to make it 10–7.  The Bengals then tied the game up when Randy Bullock kicked a 27-yard field goal to make it 10–10.  In the fourth quarter, the Steelers retook the lead with 2 field goals kicked by Boswell: from 47 and 26 yards out to make it 13–10 and then 16–10.  The Bengals got the ball back later on in the quarter.  The offense was able to drive to their own 29-yard line.  However, on the next play, Finley was sacked, then he fumbled the ball, allowing the Steelers to recover it.  The Bengals used up all their time outs before the Steelers were able to kneel out for victory, sealing yet another loss for the Bengals.

With their tenth straight loss to the Steelers, the Bengals fell to 0–11.

The next day, it was announced that Andy Dalton would start as quarterback again in week 13.

Week 13: vs. New York Jets

After yet another loss (and going 0–3 under Ryan Finley) and looking like the third team in the NFL to go 0–16 after the 2008 Detroit Lions and 2017 Cleveland Browns, the Bengals stayed home for a game against the Jets.  The Jets scored first in the first quarter when Sam Ficken kicked a 42-yard field goal to make it 3–0.  The Bengals took the lead later on in the quarter when Andy Dalton found Tyler Boyd on a 17-yard TD pass to make it 7–3.  In the second quarter, the Bengals would make it 17–3 when Randy Bullock kicked a 24-yard field goal to make it 10–3 followed up by Joe Mixon running for a 5-yard TD.  Ficken got the Jets within 11 as he kicked a 39-yard field goal to make it 17–6 at halftime. In the second half, it was all Bengals scoring as they put up a safety and field goal in the third quarter making it 22–6. A scoreless fourth quarter sealed the game for them and their first win of the season.

With the win, the Bengals won their first game of the season, improving to a record of 1–11.  Andy Dalton also won his first game back as the starting QB.

Week 14: at Cleveland Browns

After the win at home, the Bengals traveled to Cleveland for Battle Of Ohio Round 1 against the Browns.  In the first quarter, the Bengals scored first when Randy Bullock kicked a 34-yard field goal to make it 3–0.  The Browns got on the board and took the lead when Denzel Ward returned an interception 61 yards for a touchdown to make it 7–3.  The Bengals came within a point later on in the quarter when Bullock kicked a 44-yard field goal to make it 7–6.  In the second quarter, the Bengals were able to retake the lead when Joe Mixon ran for a 1-yard TD to make it 13–7.  Though, the Browns regained the lead before halftime when Baker Mayfield ran for a 7-yard TD to make it 14–13.  In the third quarter, the Browns increased their lead when Kareem Hunt ran for a 7-yard TD to make it 21–13.  Though, the Bengals were able to come within 5 when Bullock hit yet another field goal from 28 yards out to make it 21–16.  The Browns pulled away when Austin Seibert kicked a 53-yard field goal to make it 24–16.  In the fourth quarter, the Browns pulled away by double digits when Seibert kicked another field goal from 31 yards out to make the score 27–16.  The Bengals then came within 8 when Bullock kicked a 46-yard field goal to make it 27–19.  Later on in the quarter, the Bengals tried for an onside kick.  Though, the Browns would recover sealing the Bengals loss.

With the loss and their third straight to the Browns, the Bengals fell to 1–12.  The team is also assured last place in the AFC North for the second straight season.

Week 15: vs. New England Patriots

After another tough road loss, the Bengals went home to take on the Patriots.  The Pats scored first in the first quarter when Tom Brady found James White on a 23-yard TD pass to make it 7–0.  The Bengals then managed to tie it up and then take the lead when Cethan Carter caught an 8-yard TD pass from Andy Dalton to make it 7–7, followed by Randy Bullock kicking a 34-yard field goal to make it 10–7.  In the second quarter, it was all Pats when Nick Folk kicked 2 field goals: from 40 and 46 yards out to make the score 10–10 and then give his team a 13–10 halftime lead.  In the third quarter, the Pats went back to work as Brady found N'Keal Henry on a 7-yard TD pass to make it 20–10, followed by Stephon Gilmore returning an interception 64 yards for a touchdown to make it 27–10.  The Bengals came within 2 touchdowns in the fourth when Bullock kicked a 48-yard field goal to make it 27–13.  However, the Pats wrapped up the scoring of the game when Rex Burkhead ran for a 33-yard touchdown to make the final score 34–13, sealing another loss for the Bengals.

With the loss, the Bengals fell to 1–13.  Andy Dalton also put up a new record of games started and lost in a single season, surpassing the 9 losses from the 2016 season.

Week 16: at Miami Dolphins

The Bengals headed down south to take on the Dolphins in head coach Zac Taylor's first return to Miami in 4 years. Taylor served as the quarterbacks coach/offensive coordinator for the Dolphins under then-head coach Joe Philbin from 2012-2015. In the first quarter, it was all Dolphins when Ryan Fitzpatrick found Christian Wilkins on a 1-yard TD pass to make it 7–0. They would make it 14–0 when DeVante Parker caught a 7-yard TD pass from Fitzpatrick.  The Bengals were able to get on the board in the second quarter when Randy Bullock kicked a 20-yard field goal to make it 14–3. However, the Dolphins made it 21–3 when Fitzpatrick found Mike Gesicki on a 31-yard TD pass. Bullock ended the scoring of the half when he kicked a 57-yard field goal for a halftime score of 21–6. In the third quarter, Fitzpatrick for Gesicki again on a 13-yard TD pass to make it 28–6. The Bengals drew closer when Andy Dalton found Tyler Boyd on a 34-yard TD pass (with a failed two-point conversion) to make it 28–12.  The Dolphins pulled away in the fourth quarter when Myles Gaskin ran for a 2-yard touchdown. However, the Bengals were able to tie the game up late in the quarter when first Dalton found C. J. Uzomah on an 8-yard TD pass to make it 35–19, followed by Dalton finding Tyler Boyd on a 2-yard TD pass (with a successful 2-point conversion) to make it 35–27. After recovering the onside kick, the Bengals drove down the field to tie the game up at 35–35 after Dalton found Tyler Eifert on a 25-yard TD pass (with another successful two-point conversion) at the end of regulation. In overtime however, after going back and forth with the ball, the Dolphins were able to drive down the field in the final seconds. This allowed Jason Sanders to kick the game-winning 37-yard field goal for the final score 38–35.

With the loss, the Bengals fell to 1–14. The team would also clinch the first overall pick in the 2020 Draft.

Week 17: vs. Cleveland Browns

With the win, the Bengals ended their season with a 2–14 record and avoided setting a new franchise-worst regular season record. This was their only win against an AFC North opponent as they managed to snap their 3-game losing streak to the Browns. This marked Andy Dalton's final game as a Bengal, as he was released the following offseason.

Standings

Division

Conference

References

External links
 

Cincinnati
Cincinnati Bengals seasons
Cincinnati Bengals